Henrik Jørgen Schibsted Huitfeldt (8 January 1907 – 1979) was a Norwegian newspaper editor.

Personal life
He was born in Kristiania as a son of physician Hans L. C. Huitfeldt (1876–1969) and Gudrun Schibsted (1881–1966). He was a paternal grandson of Henrik Jørgen Huitfeldt-Kaas and maternal grandson of Amandus Schibsted.

In 1935 he married Sofie Helene Wigert, but the marriage was dissolved. In 1949 he married Anita Wimmer.

Career
He finished his secondary education in 1926 and took economics at Oxford University in 1929. He was hired in Aftenposten in 1930. Here he was promoted to subeditor in 1935 and editor-in-chief in 1945. He retired in 1973.

During the occupation of Norway by Nazi Germany, Huitfeldt was imprisoned by the Nazi authorities and held in Grini concentration camp from 13 January to 24 December 1942.

He was decorated as an Officer of the Order of Orange-Nassau. He died in 1979.

References 

1907 births
1979 deaths
Writers from Oslo
Grini concentration camp survivors
Norwegian newspaper editors
Aftenposten editors
Officers of the Order of Orange-Nassau
20th-century Norwegian writers